Twisted Angel is the fifth studio album by American country pop singer LeAnn Rimes, released in the United States on October 1, 2002 by Curb Records.

LeAnn performed the track "Love Is an Army" at the 2003 Country Music Awards.

The track "You Made Me Find Myself" is a cover. It was originally performed and written by international recording artist Tina Arena on her album Just Me.

The track "Review My Kisses" was covered by international recording artist Lara Fabian on her A Wonderful Life album.

Background
After re-signing her contract with Curb Records, Rimes began work recording songs for Twisted Angel for three years. It is the first album she would do under her new management. It is also the first album that Rimes's father, Wilbur C. Rimes, did not produce - instead Rimes was the executive producer of the album herself.

Singles
Two singles were released from the album. "Life Goes On" was released as the lead single from the album on August 26, 2002. Holly George-Warren of Entertainment Weekly claimed the song would "probably go on to number one on the pop chart." The song peaked at number nine on the Adult Contemporary chart, thirty-five on the Pop Songs chart, twenty-eight on the Adult Pop Songs and sixty on the Country Songs chart in the US. 

The second single and final single, "Suddenly", was released internationally on February 18, 2003. The song peaked at forty-three on the Country song chart in the US.

Critical reception

The album was met with mixed reviews, as Metacritic gave it a score of 51 out of 100. Stephen Thomas Erlewine of Allmusic gave a mixed review about the album. Though praising Rimes for her conversion to pop by stating that it "isn't a bad career move at all, since there's a void there with the absence of Whitney Houston, the breakdown of Mariah Carey, and Christina Aguilera's bizarre insistence to strip instead of sing", Erlewine noted that Rimes "may not be an audience for it: even though this is well done, it is so pop it will alienate her older fans, and she needs to win over an older audience that may not be taken with her newly sexualized image." He also stated that the song-writing in on the album was "a little uneven; often, it's very good workmanlike mainstream pop, but there are a couple of duds (namely, the irritating chorus on the "sassy" "Trouble With Goodbye"), and even the best material is melodic without being hooky or memorable." Erlewine's biggest problem was the production and attitude of the album which he stated is "kind of fall through the cracks in 2002, when teen pop is dead and mainstream pop is veering away from divas and toward quirkier, friendlier singers like Vanessa Carlton, Avril Lavigne, and Michelle Branch." Erlewine concluded with stating that even though Rimes didn't do a bad job trying to get into mainstream pop he did state that the album is a bit "dated" and stated that Rimes would be better off using a different production team than Desmond Child. Jon Caramanica of Entertainment Weekly on the other hand gave the album a C+, stating that Rimes "desperately wants to play with the bad girls" and concluded by writing "Someone unbreak her heart, please." Dave Gil de Rubio of Barnes & Noble.com stated that Rimes is "moving farther from her country music roots with a set of songs closer in spirit to junior divas Britney and Christina."  Jon Caramanica of Rolling Stone gave the album two out of five stars and stated, "Rimes, who got her start aping Patsy Cline, slaps her throaty drawl over hip-hop lite beats Jessica Simpson wouldn't touch, and a succession of mushy love songs don't help.  With golden pipes and white-bread good looks, she could succeed Celine Dion as North America's ranking pop balladeer; in the meantime let's hope Nashville will take her back, and quick."

Track listing

Credits and personnel
Credits for Twisted Angel were adapted from liner notes.

A thru K

 Peter Amato – arrangement, keyboards, producer, programming, recording
 Stephanie Bennett – harp
 Charlie Bisharat – violin
 Gareth Bowser – assistant engineer
 Chandler Bridges – additional engineering
 Chris Brooke – recording
 Denyse Buffum – viola 
 Eve Butler – violin
 David Campbell – French horn, string quintet arrangement, timpani arrangement, conductor
 Andreas Carlsson – background vocals
 Sueann Carwell – background vocals
 Rob Chairelli – mix, recording
 Susan Chatman – violin
 Desmond Child – producer
 Steve Churchyard – recording
 Chris Clark – assistant engineer, assistant mix engineer
 Jon Clarke – alto flute, oboe
 Peter Cobbin – mixing, piano, programming, recording
 Brian Coleman – production manager
 Luis Conte – percussion
 Larry Corbett – cello 
 Joel Derouin – violin 
 Brad Dutz – timpani
 Gyan Evans – background vocals*
 Charlie Everett – violin
 DJ Mega Man – scratches
 Phill Dukes – viola
 Steve Ferrone – drums
 Michelle Forbes – assistant mix engineer
 Sherree Ford – background vocals
 Matt Funes – viola
 Humberto Gatica – recording
 Alex Gibson – assistant engineer
 Conrad Golding – additional engineering, assistant engineer
 Jules Gondar – recording
 Matt Gruber – recording
 Bernie Grundman – mastering
 Dino Herrmann – additional engineering
 Gerry Hilera – violin
 Brian Humphrey – assistant engineer
 Eric Jackson – acoustic guitar
 Corky James – electric guitar
 Suzi Katayama – orchestra manager
 Zev Katz – acoustic bass
 Peter Kent – violin
 Pat Kiernan – violin

*Note: Gary Evans appears courtesy of Deston Entertainment

L thru Z

 Abe Laboriel Jr. – drums
 Abraham Laboriel – bass guitar
 Michael Landau – electric guitar
 Ana Landauer – violin
 Greg Landon – assistant engineer
 Matt Lavalla – recording, assistant engineer
 Craig Lozowick – additional engineering
 Darrin McCann – viola
 Bill Malina – additional engineering
 Nathan Malki – additional engineering
 Manny Marroquin – mixing
 Joe Meyer – French Horn
 John Morrical – assistant engineer
 Robbie Nevil – electric guitar
 Pete Novak – assistant mix engineer
 Jeanette Olsson – background vocals
 Simon Oswell – viola
 Charlie Paakkari – assistant engineer
 Gregg Paganni – arrangement, keyboard, producer, programming, recording
 Sid Page – violin
 Sara Parkins – violin
 Nora Payne – background vocals
 Bob Peterson – violin
 Kazi Pitelka – viola
 Tony Pleeth – cello
 Michelle Richards – violin
 Steve Richards – cello
 LeAnn Rimes – lead vocals, background vocals, executive producer
 Anatoly Rosinski – violin
 Alan Sanderson – assistant engineer
 Jonathan Schwarts – acoustic bass
 Mary Scully – bass guitar
 Leland Sklar – bass guitar
 Dan Smith – cello
 Ed Stein – violin
 Ruby Stein – cello
 Michael Thompson – electric guitar
 Rebeka Tuinei – assistant mix engineer
 John Wittenberg – violin
 Margaret Wooten – violin
 Gavyn Writer – violin 
 Jennifer Young – assistant engineer

Charts
Twisted Angel debuted at #12 on Billboard 200 with 61,398 copies sold in its 1st week, it fell by 47% with 32,619 copies sold in its 2nd week. and a 14% decrease in its 3rd with 28,176 copies sold.

Weekly charts

Year-end charts

Certifications

Release history

References

External links

2002 albums
Curb Records albums
LeAnn Rimes albums
Albums produced by Desmond Child
Contemporary R&B albums by American artists